HMAS Coogee was a passenger ferry that briefly served as a Royal Australian Navy armed patrol vessel and minesweeper in the latter part of the First World War. She was launched in 1887 and scuttled in 1928.

History
J.L. Thompson and Sons built her at North Sands, Sunderland as Lancashire Witch, launching her on 23 March 1887 and completing her on 9 May. John Dickinson and Son of Monkwearmouth built her triple-expansion steam engines.

The New Isle of Man Steam Navigation Company had ordered her to be a ferry between Liverpool and the Isle of Man. However, in 1888 Huddart Parker bought her, renamed her Coogee and registered her in Melbourne.

On 20 May 1918 the Royal Australian Navy requisitioned Coogee and commissioned her as a minesweeper for the Bass Strait and as an armed patrol vessel. In 1919 the RAN returned her to her owners. In 1921 the Postmaster-General's Department chartered her to repair the Bass Strait cable.

Fate
In 1927 Huddart Parker sold Coogee for scrap.
The wreck is now a popular dive site.

References

External links
 

1887 ships
Bass Strait ferries
Coastal trading vessels of Australia
Ferries of the United Kingdom
Iron and steel steamships of Australia
Minesweepers of the Royal Australian Navy
Patrol vessels of the Royal Australian Navy
Scuttled vessels of Australia
Ships built on the River Wear
Shipwrecks of Victoria (Australia)
Steamships of Australia
Steamships of the United Kingdom
Underwater diving sites in Australia
World War I merchant ships of Australia
World War I naval ships of Australia